Ilya Igorevich Soshnin (born 21 June 1987) is a former Russian professional football player.

External links
 Career summary by sportbox.ru
 
 

1987 births
Living people
Russian footballers
Russian expatriate footballers
Expatriate footballers in Moldova
FC Tiraspol players
FC Tyumen players
FC Taganrog players
Association football defenders
FC Saturn Ramenskoye players
FC Spartak Kostroma players
CS Tiligul-Tiras Tiraspol players
Sportspeople from Lipetsk